Valaská Belá is a village and municipality in Prievidza District in the Trenčín Region of western Slovakia.

History
In historical records the village was first mentioned in 1324.

Geography
The municipality lies at an altitude of 482 metres and covers an area of 64.774 km². It has a population of about 2327 people.

Religion

The wooden Saint Michal church, stand already  a long time in the village. Local priest Juraj Gábor build  the first single-aisle brick church with saddle roof  in 1737. The roof was covered with shingle. At the end of the 18th century the parishioners built the brick chapel. The present church is from the year 1800. Primarily it was a longitudinal single-aisle church with one tower ornamented with prissian paintings.  In 1929 were put to the main aisle another two aisles similar ornamented as the first main aisle. In 1944 was the interior paint up by academical painter Štefan Enhoff. In 60. years became the church a historic landmark.

External links
http://www.statistics.sk/mosmis/eng/run.html
Valaská Belá homepage

Villages and municipalities in Prievidza District